James Okoye Chukuka Ezeilo (17 January 1930 – 2013) was the first professor of mathematics in Nigeria. He was often regarded as the father of modern mathematics in the country and was the fifth vice chancellor of the University of Nigeria, Nsukka. He was Vice Chancellor of Bayero University Kano from 1977 to 1978. He was an alumnus of Cambridge University and died in 2013.

He pioneered the use of Leray-Schauder degree type arguments to obtain existence results for periodic solutions of ordinary differential equations.

References 

1930 births
2013 deaths
Academic staff of the University of Nigeria
Alumni of the University of Cambridge
20th-century Nigerian mathematicians
Vice-Chancellors of the University of Nigeria
Fellows of the African Academy of Sciences